Houle is a surname. Notable people with the surname include:

 David Houle (biologist), evolutionary biologist 
 David Houle (futurist) (born 1948), futurist and author
 Dave Houle, high school coach
 Eric Houle (born 1981), Arena Football League kicker
 Hugo Houle (born 1990), Canadian professional cyclist
 Marie-Josée Houle (21st century), Canadian accordionist
 Marielle Houle (21st century), Canadian criminal
 Mariette Houle (born 1954), former Canadian handball player
 Martin Houle (born 1985), Canadian professional ice hockey player
 Réjean Houle (born 1949), Canadian ice hockey forward